Pascal Amélété Abalo Dosseh (7 March 1962 – 9 January 2010) was the assistant coach of the Togo national football team and manager of ASKO Kara.

Career

Playing career
Abalo began his career with Le Dynamic togolais. From 1982 to 1990, he played in the Togolese Championnat National as a striker for ASKO Kara.

Coaching career
From 2004 until his death, he coached ASKO Kara. In addition, he worked as an assistant coach for the Togo national football team since 2006.

Death
He was killed in the Togo national football team bus attack by the terrorist group Front for the Liberation of the Enclave of Cabinda when travelling to the 2010 Africa Cup of Nations.

Honours

Club 
ASKO Kara
 Togolese Championnat National: 2007, 2009

Individual 

 Togolese Coach of the Year: 2007

References

1962 births
2010 deaths
Deaths by firearm in Angola
Male murder victims
Terrorism victims
Togolese football managers
Togolese people murdered abroad
People murdered in Angola
ASKO Kara players
Togolese footballers
Association football forwards
2010 murders in Africa
2010s murders in Angola
2010 crimes in Angola
21st-century Togolese people